Montluel station (French: Gare de Montluel) is a French railway station located in the commune of Montluel, Ain department in the Auvergne-Rhône-Alpes region. Established at an elevation of 198 meters, the station is located at kilometric point (KP) 25.195 on the Lyon–Geneva railway, between the stations of La Boisse and La Valbonne.

As of 2022, the station is owned and operated by the SNCF and served by TER Auvergne-Rhône-Alpes trains.

History 
The section of railway between Lyon and Ambérieu opened on 23 June 1856. Initially from Lyon-Saint-Clair station, as the bridge across the Rhône was not yet finished, the line traveled along to the river until the Miribel station and extending until Montluel.

On 7 January 2011, a 16-year old teenager, Antoine Mauresa, was fatally wounded by a TER train at the station. Following the incident, the safety of the station (which had no pedestrian overpass or underpass at the time), was widely called into question. The mayor of Montluel, Jacky Bernard, supported the construction of a separated passage-way. The fully accessible passenger overpass was ultimately completed the year following, in 2012. 

In 2019, the SNCF estimated that 509,568 passengers traveled through the station.

Services

Passenger services 
Operated by the SNCF, the station has a passenger building equipped with automatic vending machines for purchasing tickets. Since 2012, a fully accessible passenger overpass has allowed for movement from one platform to another.

Train services 
Montluel station is served by TER Auvergne-Rhône-Alpes trains running between Lyon-Part-Dieu or Lyon-Perrache and Ambérieu-en-Bugey. Connections are possible from Ambérieu-en-Bugey station towards Culoz, Genève-Cornavin, Évian-les-Bains, Annecy, and Saint-Gervais-les-Bains-Le Fayet.

Intermodality 
The station is equipped with bicycle storage facilities.

See also 
 List of SNCF stations in Auvergne-Rhône-Alpes

References 
TER Auvergne-Rhône-Alpes
Railway stations in Ain
Lyon–Geneva railway
Montluel

Railway stations in France opened in 1856